Mumble may refer to:

 Mumble (Happy Feet), the main character from the Happy Feet franchise
 Mumble (software), open source voice over IP client/server
 Mumble Bumble, a Canadian children's animated television program
 Mumble rap, a disputed subgenre of hip-hop music, considered by some to be a pejorative.

See also
 Mumbles (disambiguation)